You Think You Really Know Me is the debut album by Gary Wilson. It was reissued by Motel Records in 2002.

Background
Gary Wilson went to Albert Grossman's Bearsville Studios in Woodstock, New York in 1976, a well-known recording studio that has played host to sessions by Bob Dylan, R.E.M., Patti Smith, The Rolling Stones and many other notable acts. There, Wilson recorded versions of "6.4 = Make Out", "Chromium Bitch", "Groovy Girls", and "I Want To Lose Control". He eventually decided that he would prefer to record at his familiar home studio and finished recording You Think You Really Know Me, his first album, in his parents' basement. On this recording, Wilson sometimes played solo and was other times accompanied by a backing band, The Blind Dates. He pressed, distributed, funded and released the album himself. Wilson pressed 300 copies in 1977 and a further 300 copies in 1979 (he now claims that he only has two original copies left in his personal possession from these pressings). In 1991, Cry Baby Records re-released the album, pressing about 1000 copies.

Reception
You Think You Really Know Me did not gain substantial attention upon its initial 1977 release. Though re-released again in 1979, to little fanfare, the album eventually gained a cult following. Beck namechecked Wilson in his 1996 song "Where It's At", one of his biggest hits. Feeding Tube Records described the album as "the sound of a 23 year old oddball from upstate New York, wrestling with his demons and actually winning. There’s nothing quite like it. And it offers a story of hope to every weirdo who hears it."

Track listing

"Another Time I Could Have Loved You" - 1:14
"You Keep on Looking" - 2:05
"6.4 = Make Out" - 5:01
"When You Walk Into My Dreams" - 2:39
"Loneliness" - 3:04
"Cindy" - 2:50
"You Were Too Good to Be True" - 1:59
"Groovy Girls Make Love at the Beach" - 4:09
"I Wanna Lose Control" - 2:22
"You Think You Really Know Me" - 2:06
"Chromium Bitch" - 3:26
"And Then I Kissed Your Lips" - 2:51

Personnel
Credits adapted from You Think You Really Know Me liner notes.

Musicians
 Gary Wilson – vocals, guitar, bass, synthesizer, electric piano, organ, drums
 Gary Iacovelli – drums (3, 4, 7, 8, 11)
 Vince Rossi – trombone (5)
 Greg McQuade – synthesizer (9)
 Dave Haney – backing vocals (9)
 Tom Ciotoli – backing vocals (9)

Production
 Gary Wilson – production
 Joe Yankee – mastering
 Adrian Milan – artwork 
 Christina Bates – artwork

References 

1977 albums
Gary Wilson (musician) albums
Lo-fi music albums
Albums recorded in a home studio